Miss America 1927, the seventh Miss America pageant, was held at the Million Dollar Pier in Atlantic City, New Jersey on Friday, September 9, 1927. The winner was 16-year-old Lois Delander who competed as Miss Illinois. She won the Miss America title on her parents' twentieth wedding anniversary.

This marked the last pageant to be held in the 1920s, the next Miss America competition would not be held until 1933.

Results

Placements

Other awards

Contestants

References

External links
 Miss America official website

1927
1927 in the United States
1927 in New Jersey
September 1927 events
Events in Atlantic City, New Jersey